The Malaysia Sevens is an annual rugby union sevens tournament contested by national teams. The event was first hosted as a leg of the IRB World Sevens Series in 2001 and 2002. 

The Malaysia sevens was then made as an official event in the Asian Sevens Series between 2009 and 2014, with the event first being held in Borneo before being moved back to Kuala Lumpur in 2013.

Results

Key:Blue border on the left indicates tournaments included in the World Rugby Sevens Series.

References

 
Former World Rugby Sevens Series tournaments
Asian Seven Series
International rugby union competitions hosted by Malaysia
Rugby sevens competitions in Asia
Recurring sporting events established in 2001
Recurring sporting events disestablished in 2014
2001 establishments in Malaysia
2014 disestablishments in Malaysia